There is long standing controversy regarding Nancy Hanks Lincoln's heritage. Nancy (b. 1784, d. 1818) was the first wife of Thomas Lincoln and mother of the 16th president Abraham Lincoln. Her familial background according to historian Albert J. Beveridge is as "Dim as the dream of a shifting mirage ... her face and figure waver through the mists of time and rumor."

Although no documentation has been found to identify Nancy Hanks' parents, there were two main theories about the identity of Nancy's mother:

 One popular theory among historians and genealogists is that she was the illegitimate daughter of Lucy Hanks, who married Henry Sparrow in 1790 in Mercer County, Kentucky.  This theory has been proved using mitochondrial DNA obtained from descendants of Lucy Hanks Sparrow and mtDNA of descendants of daughters of Ann (Lee) Hanks, wife of Joseph Hanks of Nelson County, Kentucky which all match.
 Information from the Shipley and Berry families, as well as some historical sites, claim that Nancy's mother was Lucy or Lucey Shipley, sister to Rachel Shipley Berry.  This theory has been disproved by the same mtDNA study.

This article explores the information about Nancy's heritage published in books and national, state or local historic site literature prior to DNA testing.

Families

Hanks family

Maternal and paternal relationship theories
Nancy's assumed mother, Lucy, is related to the Hanks, either through birth or marriage. Nancy's grandparents are believed to be Ann ("Nannie") and Joseph Hanks of North Farnham Parish, Richmond County, Virginia. They are said to have raised her from infancy until about nine years of age when her grandfather died.

The question is whether Nancy is related to the Hanks on her paternal or maternal side.
 Maternal side – The prevailing theory today is that Nancy's assumed mother's maiden name was Lucy Hanks, herself assumed by many to be the daughter of Joseph and Ann Hanks.  If this is true, Nancy Hanks was born illegitimate. Author John Y. Simon writes: "... the evidence is strong that Lincoln himself thought his mother was illegitimate. He had grown up with this crowd of Hanks people, many of them illiterate, and some of them quite likely to give birth without getting married first. He saw this as a kind of stain on himself, and he was troubled by it.'

Abraham Lincoln believed his mother was illegitimate. According to Lincoln's partner, William Herndon, Lincoln had confessed that his mother, "Nancy Hanks", was illegitimate. In a day when there was a strong stigma against illegitimacy, Abraham wrote about his mother in his campaign biography:

... He [Thomas Lincoln] married Nancy Hanks – mother of the present subject [Abraham Lincoln] – in the year 1806. She was also born in Virginia; and relatives of hers of the name of Hanks, and other names, now reside in Coles, in Macon, and in Adams Counties, Illinois, and also in Iowa.

Nancy's cousin Dennis Hanks asked that Nancy be called "Nancy Sparrow" and not Nancy Hanks. (Lucy and her sister Elizabeth, who raised Nancy and Dennis, did not marry the Sparrow men until years after Nancy was born.) His concern was that Nancy Hanks would be thought by others to be "base-born" or illegitimate if she was known as Nancy Hanks. According to William Eleazar Barton in the "Life of Abraham Lincoln" and Michael Burkhimer in "100 Essential Lincoln Books", Dennis Hanks tried to cover up the illegitimacy to protect Abraham and Nancy's reputation.

A challenge to the theory that Lucy was born to Joseph and Ann Hanks is that she was not included in Joseph Hanks's will, which was probated May 14, 1793 in Nelson County, Kentucky.

 Paternal side – another theory is that Nancy's assumed mother, Lucy Shipley, married James Hanks, son of Joseph Hanks. After James Hank's death, Lucy moved to Kentucky to live with relatives or, by 1791, Nancy lived with Lucy's assumed sister Rachel and brother-in-law, Richard Berry, Sr.

Joseph Hanks has also been named as Nancy's father. This seems to be a confusion about multiple Nancy Hanks in the same family. Joseph Hanks had a daughter named Nancy, who gave birth to an illegitimate child, Dennis Hanks in 1799 and who later married Levi Hall.

Joseph and Ann Hanks

According to this theory, Nancy Hanks first lived in her grandparents', Joseph and Ann Hanks', cabin in what was then Hampshire County, Virginia (now Mineral County, West Virginia). The Hanks family, with Lucy and Nancy, then moved in March, 1784 to Kentucky. In 1787 they settled about 2 miles north of the mouth of Pottinger's Creek and Rolling Fork, in a settlement called Rolling Fork or Pottinger's Creek settlement, in Nelson County, Kentucky.

Joseph Hanks died in 1793. It is commonly believed by historians that Nancy's grandmother, also named Nancy but generally called Ann, decided to return to the homeland of her youth and much of her adulthood in old Farnham parish in Virginia. At that time, Nancy went to live for an unspecified period of time with her mother who was now Lucy Hanks Sparrow, having married Henry Sparrow in Harrodsburg, Kentucky two or three years earlier. Then, in 1796, after her aunt Elizabeth married Thomas Sparrow, Nancy went to live with the newly married couple and called them "mother" and "father". The Sparrows are said to have been neighbors of John Berry.

Sparrow marriages

Lucy Hanks and Henry Sparrow
Regarding the stigma of an unwed mother, author Ralph Gary wrote: "Lucy's baby, if born out of wedlock, was not only a disgrace, but also subjected Lucy to an indictable offense at the time."

After "fornication" charges were brought against Lucy Hanks in November 1789 in Mercer County, Kentucky, Henry Sparrow announced that he would marry Lucy and in 1790 signed a marriage bond. On April 26, 1790, the marriage license was issued and the following year, on April 3, 1791, the couple was married by a Baptist preacher, Reverend John Bailey. In May 1790, the court met and dropped the charges against Lucy Hanks.

Following Lucy's marriage to Henry Sparrow, the couple had eight or nine children and Lucy had a reputation as a "fine Christian woman". Two sons were loyal to the Union during the Civil War and were preachers. Per authors Harold and Ernestine Briggs, "After her marriage there were no more complaints against her character."

Elizabeth Hanks and Thomas Sparrow
Elizabeth Hanks, daughter of Joseph Hanks, married Thomas Sparrow in Mercer County, Kentucky in 1796. Thomas was Henry Sparrow's brother. That year Nancy went to live with the newly married couple – whom she called "mother and father". Nancy then also began to be called Nancy Sparrow. Lucy's sister Nancy Hanks gave birth to an illegitimate son in 1799 named Dennis Friend Hanks who was also raised by Elizabeth and Thomas Sparrows. Dennis was Nancy Hanks Lincoln's cousin.

The Thomas Lincoln family and Elizabeth and Thomas Sparrow often lived near one another. Nancy and Thomas Lincoln's home near Hodgenville at Nolin Creek was about 2 miles from the Sparrow's cabin. Elizabeth ("Betsy") ministered to baby and mother at Abraham Lincoln's birth in 1809. Then, in 1817 one year after Thomas and Nancy moved to Indiana, Nancy's Aunt Elizabeth Sparrow, Uncle Thomas Sparrow and Cousin Dennis Hanks moved onto Lincoln's property at Little Pigeon Creek (at the Little Pigeon Creek Community).  The Sparrows died in September 1818 of milk sickness, weeks later in early October Nancy also died of the poisoned milk. Nancy Hanks Lincoln was buried next to Elizabeth and Thomas Sparrow "on a knoll overlooking" the cabin.

Abraham Lincoln, however, did not apparently know while growing up that the people introduced to him as Aunt Lucy and Uncle Henry were truly his grandmother and step-grandfather and Elizabeth Hanks Sparrow was not "Granny", but his aunt.

Shipley family

Lucy Shipley
An alternate theory about Nancy Hanks' parentage is that she is not an illegitimate child born to Lucy, but the daughter of Lucy Shipley and James Hanks, who was believed to have died before Lucy moved to Kentucky. In this case, Joseph and Ann Hanks are Lucy's in-laws. Author Louis Warren claimed that Lucy was the sister of Rachel Shipley who married Richard Berry and Naomi Shipley who married Robert Mitchell.  The Shipley girl's father was believed to be Robert Shipley. The primary sources for this information are decades old publications.

It is clear from multiple sources that Nancy Hanks lived at the Berry's household for some period of time, the exact time period(s), however, is unclear. See the following section regarding the "Berry family" for information regarding Rachel Shipley and Richard Berry, Sr's family.

Mary Shipley
There is also a theory that Captain Abraham Lincoln, Thomas Lincoln's father, was married first to Mary Shipley. Lea and Hutchinson said in 1909 that Mary Shipley was from Lunenburg County, Virginia. She was believed to be the daughter of Robert and Sarah Shipley. Having died by 1779, Mary is believed, under this theory, to be the mother of Captain Abraham Lincoln's oldest children. Bathsheba Lincoln appears on real estate documents by 1780 and is believed to be the mother of Thomas Lincoln.

Author and historian William Barton said in 1927 that the following account was undisputed for 25 years: Mary Shipley was sister to women who married: Joseph Hanks, maternal grandfather of Nancy Hanks, Mr. Berry, Mr. Mitchell and Mr. Thompson, all from Lunenburg County, Virginia. All five Shipley sisters are said to have moved to Washington County, Kentucky. This would make the following connection for Abraham: "Thomas Lincoln, son of Abraham and Mary Shipley Lincoln, married Nancy daughter of Joseph and Mary Shipley Hanks; and their second child and first son was Abraham Lincoln." However, Barton was unable to find any documentation that showed that the Hanks and Shipleys lived near one another during the time periods in question. There were Hawks family members, though, who lived near Shipleys, Mitchells and Thompsons; previous writers assumed the Hawks family were later called the Hanks family. He did find, though, the birthplace of Nancy Hanks in Hampshire County, Virginia and the Joseph Hanks family on the 1782 census for that area.

Berry family
There are some areas where there seems to be a clear intersection of Thomas Lincoln and Nancy Hanks’ lives with the Berrys:
 Beechland property for the Lincolns' home was purchased from Richard Berry, Sr. and Thomas was a neighbor of the Berry family
 John Berry witnessed the signature of Lucy Hank's marriage bond to Henry Sparrow
 Nancy Hanks lived in her young adulthood at one or more Berry households prior to her marriage to Thomas Lincoln
 Richard Berry, Jr. signed the Thomas Lincoln and Nancy Hanks marriage bond as "guardian"

What is not clear, and what is disputed by contemporary historians, is whether or not Nancy Hanks is of Shipley ancestry and whether she lived with the Berrys during her childhood. Two key sources of information about Nancy Hanks living with the Berrys as a child are 1) Sarah Mitchell, who lived with the Richard Berry, Sr. and Rachel Shipley Berry after 1785, and 2) Robert Mitchell Berry, son of Richard Berry, Jr., who says that Nancy Hanks lived with Richard Berry, Sr.

Berry and Lincoln settlement at Beechland
The Berry family in Nancy Hanks’ history lived in Beechland, north of Springfield. The neighborhood was a piece of land created by a horseshoe bend in the Beech Fork River. Richard Berry, Sr. had settled in the area and in 1781 or 1782 sold a 100-acre piece of his property along a creek known now as Lincoln Run to Abraham Lincoln. Lincoln reputedly built a cabin for the Lincoln family before his death in May, 1786.

Richard Berry, Sr.'s brother, Francis, was also an early settler in the Beechland neighborhood.

Lucy Hanks legal issues
The Mercer County community brought charges against Lucy Hanks for "fornication" in November, 1789. John Berry of Doctor's Fork of the Chaplin River (near Perrysville), son of Rachel Shipley and Richard Berry, was on the Grand Jury. A few days before a 1790 court date, Henry Sparrow initiated a marriage bond for Lucy Hanks and himself. John Berry and Robert Mitchell (first cousin to John Berry, son of Rachel and Richard Berry) witnessed Lucy's signature to the bond.

After Joseph Hanks dies in 1793
According to Louis Warren, whose research has been lauded but his findings have been disputed by modern historians, particularly "his interpretation of facts": Nancy Hanks came to live with the Rachel Shipley and Richard Berry family after her mother married (after 1790). During her time with the Berrys she befriended neighbor Thomas Lincoln. She later [unspecified time] came to live with the Richard Berry, Jr. family.

Warren further states that: In 1795 sixteen-year-old Sarah Mitchell was sent to live with her maternal aunt Rachel Shipley Berry. She was freed from Native Americans who she lived with since her mother Naomi Shipley Mitchell was killed at an ambush at a place called Defeated. According to Troy Cowan, her father Robert Mitchell drowned trying to rescue his daughter in 1790. Nancy Hanks was also living with the Berrys by 1795 and the girls believed they were first cousins and became quite close, and are also believed to have named daughters after each other. In 1800 Sarah married and moved away.

According to the Nancy Hanks Lincoln biography written by the Briggs, Nancy did not live with the Berrys while Rachel and Richard's sons Edward and Francis were still at home, but after Richard and John were married.

After Richard Berry, Sr. dies in 1798
According to Troy Cowan, some of whose findings are suspect, states that Nancy went to work for the Berrys in 1800, two years after the death of Richard Berry, Sr. and following the marriage of Richard and Rachel Berry's daughter Sarah. Aside from being a seamstress, Nancy also wove her own fabric. When Nancy was 20 years of age (about 1804), Rachel Berry died and Nancy then worked for Francis and Elizabeth Berry. In addition to sewing, she also took care of the couple's three children. She had a bit of a reputation for being familiar with boys. During this period of time Thomas was picking up work from the Sparrow, Berry and Bush families.

Francis Berry was married two years after his father's death, likely in 1800. Author Dan Davenport claims that Nancy Hanks lived at the Francis Berry house when she was courted by Thomas Lincoln.

The 1913 obituary for 95-year-old Robert Mitchell Berry that Richard Berry, Jr. raised Nancy Hanks and signed her marriage bond. Robert Mitchell Berry was Richard Berry, Jr.'s son. Born in 1769, Richard Berry, Jr. was 15 years older than Nancy.

When Nancy married Thomas Lincoln
On June 12, 1806, Hanks married Thomas Lincoln at the home of Richard Berry in Beechland by Reverend Jesse Head. Nancy was brought to the home to work as a seamstress by her friend Polly Ewing Berry, the wife of Richard Berry Jr. since October 10, 1794. Polly was a friend of Nancy's from Mercer County, Kentucky and Richard Berry, Jr. was a good friend of Thomas Lincoln.

Nancy's marriage bond was signed by Richard Berry, Jr. who identified himself as her guardian. Per Warren, "The title had no legal significance, Berry having never been so appointed, and Nancy Hanks was then of age. But of him to call himself 'guardian' was a courtesy customary under such circumstances" [no father able to sign the marriage bond].

According to author Ralph Gary, one theory is that upon moving to Washington County, Kentucky Lucy and Nancy lived at Beech Fork with relatives Rachel Shipley Berry and Richard Berry. He further stated that Rachel was considered by some to be one of Lucy's sisters. The National Park Service states in their summary of Nancy Hanks life that Richard Berry is an uncle of Nancy's.  This fits with the theory that Rachael Shipley is a relative of Lucy Shipley who married a Hanks.

Summary
This information, though, is not present in recent, solid historical books about Nancy Hanks. Perhaps a sign that the Berrys did not consider Nancy a daughter, in Richard Berry's will he mentions a daughter Sarah [Mitchell], but not Nancy.

Published information about Nancy's mother being Lucy Shipley and her father being James Hanks is contrary to the theory that Nancy was illegitimate and that Lucy was born into the Hanks family, as was published by William E. Barton in the "Life of Abraham Lincoln" and Michael Burkhimer in "100 Essential Lincoln Books".  John M. Hay and John George Nicolay, authors of "Abraham Lincoln" asserted that Berry was a connection of Lincoln's.  In his book, Doug Wead stated that Rachel was working for Richard Berry as a seamstress.

Unknown family of well-bred farmer
Abraham's law partner William Herndon reported that Abraham told him that Nancy's father was "a well-bred Virginia farmer or planter."

Lincoln is quoted as saying: "I don't know who my grandfather was; I am much more concerned to know what his grandson will be."

Timeline of events and relationships

Rumors and theories
There was some confusion about which Nancy Hanks was the mother of Abraham Lincoln. Mother Nancy was sometimes confused with her great-aunt, Nancy Hanks.

One rumor is that Nancy Hanks was raised in Rutherford County, North Carolina. Rather than being based upon published information or direct family member testimony, this theory was based upon locals belief of rumors that Hanks was raised in North Carolina. She is also said to have come to Kentucky in 1786 from the Catawba River area of North Carolina.

Another rumor was that Nancy Hanks was born into the Tanner family and was raised by Abraham Enlow of Rutherford County, North Carolina. Another rumor, perhaps the start of all Abraham Enlow rumors, was that Abraham Enloe or Enlow was Abraham's birth father. The story is that Thomas and Nancy's neighbor at the time of Abraham's birth, Abraham Enlow, was the birth father. What makes this difficult is that the Lincolns did not move near the Enlows until Nancy had already conceived Abraham, Enlow would have been 14 at that time and Enlow never admitted to being the father of Abraham Lincoln. He did tell a story, though, that the child was named after him [perhaps not knowing that Thomas' father was named Abraham] because he was sent to get midwives to assist Nancy in the birth of the baby. Stories then emerged of other Abraham Enlows or Engloes who may have been the birth father.

See also
Lincoln family tree

Notes

References

Lincoln, Nancy
Lincoln family